

Day 1 (August 26)
 Seeds out:
 Men's singles:  Kei Nishikori [11],  Fernando Verdasco [27],  Ernests Gulbis [30]
 Women's singles:  Kirsten Flipkens [12],  Magdaléna Rybáriková [29]
 Schedule

Day 2 (August 27)
 Seeds out:
 Men's singles:  Jerzy Janowicz [14],  Nicolás Almagro [15],  Grigor Dimitrov [25],  Juan Mónaco [28]
 Women's singles:  Samantha Stosur [11],  Dominika Cibulková [17],  Nadia Petrova [20],  Klára Zakopalová [31]
 Schedule

Day 3 (August 28)
 Seeds out:
 Men's singles:  Fabio Fognini [16],  Benoît Paire [24],  Jürgen Melzer [29]
 Men's doubles:  Max Mirnyi /  Horia Tecău [13],  František Čermák /  Filip Polášek [15]
 Schedule

Day 4 (August 29)
 Seeds out:
 Men's singles:  Sam Querrey [26]
 Women's singles:  Sara Errani [4],  Sorana Cîrstea [19],  Elena Vesnina [22],  Mona Barthel [28]
 Men's doubles:  Mariusz Fyrstenberg /  Marcin Matkowski [8],  David Marrero /  Fernando Verdasco [9],  Santiago González /  Scott Lipsky [11]
 Schedule

Day 5 (August 30)
 Seeds out:
 Men's singles:  Juan Martín del Potro [6],  Kevin Anderson [17]
 Women's singles:  Sabine Lisicki [16],  Jamie Hampton [23],  Kaia Kanepi [25],  Laura Robson [30],  Anastasia Pavlyuchenkova [32]
 Mixed doubles:  Anna-Lena Grönefeld /  Alexander Peya [1],  Julia Görges /  Rohan Bopanna [3]
  Schedule

Day 6 (August 31)
 Seeds out:
 Men's singles:  John Isner [13],  Feliciano López [23],  Dmitry Tursunov [32]
 Women's singles:  Caroline Wozniacki [6],  Petra Kvitová [7],  Maria Kirilenko [14],  Alizé Cornet [26],  Svetlana Kuznetsova [27]
 Men's doubles:  Julien Benneteau /  Nenad Zimonjić [7]
 Women's doubles:  Raquel Kops-Jones /  Abigail Spears [7],  Julia Görges /  Barbora Záhlavová-Strýcová [12] 
 Mixed doubles:  Katarina Srebotnik /  Nenad Zimonjić [2]
 Schedule

Day 7 (September 1)
 Seeds out:
 Men's singles:  Tommy Haas [12],  Andreas Seppi [20],  Julien Benneteau [31]
 Women's singles:  Agnieszka Radwańska [3],  Angelique Kerber [8],  Jelena Janković [9],  Sloane Stephens [15]
 Men's doubles: Rohan Bopanna /  Édouard Roger-Vasselin [6],  Michaël Llodra /  Nicolas Mahut [14]
 Women's doubles:  Anna-Lena Grönefeld /  Květa Peschke [6],  Liezel Huber /  Nuria Llagostera Vives [9],  Kristina Mladenovic /  Galina Voskoboeva [14]
 Mixed doubles:  Lisa Raymond /  Jean-Julien Rojer [6]
 Schedule

Day 8 (September 2)
 Seeds out:
 Men's singles:  Roger Federer [7],  Milos Raonic [10],  Janko Tipsarević [18],  Philipp Kohlschreiber [22]
 Women's singles:  Simona Halep [21]
 Men's doubles:  Marcel Granollers /  Marc López [3],  Colin Fleming /  Jonathan Marray [12]
 Schedule

Day 9 (September 3)
 Seeds out:
 Men's singles:  Tomáš Berdych [5]
 Women's singles:  Ana Ivanovic [13],  Carla Suárez Navarro [18],  Ekaterina Makarova [24]
 Men's doubles:  Aisam-ul-Haq Qureshi  /  Jean-Julien Rojer [5]
 Women's doubles:  Cara Black [13] /  Marina Erakovic [13],  Jelena Janković /  Mirjana Lučić-Baroni [15],  Anabel Medina Garrigues /  Flavia Pennetta [16]
 Mixed doubles:  Květa Peschke /  Marcin Matkowski [4],  Liezel Huber /  Marcelo Melo [8]
 Schedule

Day 10 (September 4)
 Seeds out:
 Men's singles:  David Ferrer [4],  Tommy Robredo [19]
 Women's singles:  Roberta Vinci [10]
 Men's doubles:  Treat Huey /  Dominic Inglot [16]
 Women's doubles:  Ekaterina Makarova /  Elena Vesnina [2],  Nadia Petrova /  Katarina Srebotnik [3],  Hsieh Su-wei /  Peng Shuai [4],  Anastasia Pavlyuchenkova /  Lucie Šafářová [11]
 Mixed doubles:  Anabel Medina Garrigues /  Bruno Soares [5]
 Schedule

Day 11 (September 5)
 Seeds out:
 Men's singles:  Andy Murray [3],  Mikhail Youzhny [21] 
 Men's doubles:  Bob Bryan /  Mike Bryan [1],  Ivan Dodig /  Marcelo Melo [10]
 Women's doubles:  Sara Errani /  Roberta Vinci [1],  Sania Mirza /  Zheng Jie [10]
 Schedule

Day 12 (September 6)
 Seeds out:
 Women's singles:  Li Na [5]
 Schedule

Day 13 (September 7)
 Seeds out:
 Men's singles:  Richard Gasquet [8],  Stanislas Wawrinka [9]
 Women's doubles:  Ashleigh Barty [8] /  Casey Dellacqua [8]
 Schedule

Day 14 (September 8)
 Seeds out:
 Women's singles:  Victoria Azarenka [2]
 Men's doubles:  Alexander Peya [2] /  Bruno Soares [2]
 Schedule

Day 15 (September 9)
 Seeds out:
 Men's singles:  Novak Djokovic [1]
 Schedule

References

Day-by-day summaries
US Open (tennis) by year – Day-by-day summaries